Lieutenant General William "Bull" O'Callaghan, BSD (3 July 1921 – 26 December 2015) was an Irish Army officer.

Early life
O'Callaghan was born in Buttevant, County Cork, and joined the Irish Defence Forces at age 17 in 1939.

Military career
O'Callaghan graduated from the Military College at Curragh Camp, County Kildare. He is most notable for being the Force Commander of the United Nations Interim Force in Lebanon from 1981 to 1986; a neutral United Nations peacekeeping force during the Lebanese Civil War.

O'Callaghan was a County Cork native who had the unique distinction of holding the two most important United Nations appointments in the Middle East during a particularly tumultuous period in the 1970s and 1980s, when he was the Force Commander of the United Nations Interim Force in Lebanon (UNIFIL) from February 1981 to May 1986 and the United Nations Truce Supervision Organization (UNTSO) from April 1978 to June 1979 and again from May 1986 to June 1987, commanding multinational troops in Syria, Lebanon, Israel, Egypt and Jordan.

In an interview in April 1982 with United States magazine People, with UNIFIL having suffered 145 combat casualties in its previous 4 years, 35 of them fatalities, O'Callaghan said: "Peacekeeping is not about firing shots. Its about not firing and stopping those who are. We must look for trouble at the 4 points of the compass, and then we look behind our backs."

Legacy
Irish cadets in training compete for an award named in his honour; the "Lt Gen William Callaghan Sword" is awarded to the cadet who displays the best tactical ability.

Honours and awards
Lieutenant General O'Callaghan was a recipient of the: Distinguished Service Medal, French Legion of Honour, and Lebanese National Order of the Cedar.

References

2015 deaths
1921 births
Irish Army generals
United Nations military personnel
Irish generals
Military personnel from County Cork